The 2006 Gloucester City Council election took place on 4 May 2006 to elect members of Gloucester City Council in England. Fifteen of the 36 seats on the council were up for election, representing a nominal "third" of the council. No seats changed party at the election, and the council remainder under no overall control. The council continued to be run by a Conservative minority administration, with Mark Hawthorne remaining leader of the council after the election.

Results  

|}

Ward results

Abbey

Barnwood

Barton and Tredworth

Elmbridge

Grange

Hucclecote

Kingsholm and Wotton

Longlevens

Matson and Robinswood

Moreland

Podsmead

Quedgeley Fieldcourt

Quedgeley Severn Vale

Tuffley

Westgate

References

2006 English local elections
2006
2000s in Gloucestershire